Gwyn Thomas may refer to:

Gwyn Thomas (sportsman) (1891–1932), Welsh cricketer for Glamorgan CCC, and rugby union footballer for Neath RFC
Gwyn Thomas (rugby), rugby union and rugby league footballer of the 1910s, and 1920s
Gwyn Thomas (novelist) (1913–1981), prose writer
Gwyn Thomas (poet) (1936–2016), National Poet for Wales 2006
Gwyn Thomas (tennis), American tennis player (female)
Gwyn Thomas (reporter) (1913–2010), crime reporter
Gwyn Thomas (footballer) (born 1957), retired Welsh footballer